A Place to Live is a 1941 documentary film directed by Irving Lerner and produced by the Philadelphia Housing Association, a nonprofit affordable housing advocacy group.  The film was designed to call attention to inner city squalor in Philadelphia, Pennsylvania by focusing on a child's journey from school to his family's cramped and squalid apartment in a rat-infested slum neighborhood.

A Place to Live was nominated for the 1941 Academy Award for Best Documentary (Short Subject).

The Academy Film Archive preserved A Place to Live in 2007.

Further reading
Bauman, John F. Public Housing, Race, and Renewal: Urban Planning in Philadelphia, 1920-1974. Temple University Press, 1987. .

References

External links
 
 
 A Place to Live at The Travel Film Archive

1941 films
Affordable housing
American documentary films
Sponsored films
Documentary films about Philadelphia
Documentary films about poverty in the United States
1941 documentary films
Black-and-white documentary films
American black-and-white films
1940s English-language films
1940s American films